No. 122 (Bombay) Squadron was a Royal Air Force fighter squadron during the First and Second World Wars.

History

The squadron was formed on 1 January 1918 at Sedgeford as a day bomber unit with the Airco DH.4, the intention was to train the squadron for operations on the de Havilland DH.9 but the squadron disbanded without seeing action on 17 August 1918. The squadron was reformed at RAF Upper Heyford in October 1918 with the intent to operate the de Havilland DH.10 but the Armistice was declared before the squadron had any aircraft and it was disbanded without being operational on 20 November 1918.

No. 122 was reformed in 1941 at RAF Turnhouse with the Supermarine Spitfire I to operate convoy patrols in the Firth of Forth, it soon moved south into England to become part of the Hornchurch Wing with cannon-equipped Spitfires and it flew sweeps over northern France and participated in the Dieppe operations.  In 1942 František Fajtl became the squadron commander, the first Czech to lead a RAF squadron. In October 1942 it was reequipped with the Spitfire IX and continued operations over France.

In January 1944 it re-equipped with the North American Mustang to operate long-range bomber escort duties and it also attacked targets in France and the Low Countries.  Within a few months the Mustangs were converted into fighter-bombers and the squadron started long-range ground-attack sorties into continental Europe. Under the command of Squadron Leader Ernest Joyce, it was heavily involved in D-Day operations and within a few weeks had moved to France to support the invasion. After three-months of intense operations the squadron was withdrawn to England and continued till the end of the war providing long-range escorts to both Bomber Command and the United States 8th Air Force.

After the end of the war the squadron was re-equipped with the Spitfire F21 but was disbanded at RAF Dalcross on 1 April 1946 when it was renumbered No. 41 Squadron.

Aircraft operated

References

External links

Air of Authority - A History of RAF Organisation
Official history on RAF.mod.uk

122
122
Military units and formations established in 1918
Military units and formations disestablished in 1946
1918 establishments in the United Kingdom